2C-H (2,5-dimethoxyphenethylamine) is a lesser-known substituted phenethylamine of the 2C family.

History 
2C-H was first synthesized in 1932 by Johannes S. Buck.

Use 
2C-H is used as a precursor in the synthesis of other substituted phenethylamines such as 2C-B, 2C-I, and 2C-N.  2C-H has been found in trace amounts by the DEA's south central laboratory in tablets that were suspected of containing MDMA.

Pharmacology 
There is no record of 2C-H trials in humans, as it would likely be destroyed by monoamine oxidase enzymes before causing any significant psychoactive effects. In the book PiHKAL, Alexander Shulgin lists both the dosage and duration of 2C-H effects as unknown. Very little data exists about the pharmacological properties, metabolism, and toxicity of 2C-H.

Research 
2C-H exhibits agonist activity in vitro at human trace amine associated receptor 1 expressed in RD-HGA16 CHO-K1 cells coexpressed with Galpha16 protein assessed as internal calcium mobilization. 2C-H was found to be inactive in NCI In Vivo Anticancer Drug Screens for tumor model L1210 Leukemia. It was found to be an active Alpha-1 adrenergic receptor agonist in rabbit ear arteries. It has binding affinity towards 5-HT2C and 5-HT2A receptors in rats. It features competitive antagonist activity at 5-HT serotonin receptor in Sprague-Dawley rat stomachs. It exhibits binding affinity against rat 5-hydroxytryptamine 2C receptors using [3H]mesulergine as a radioligand.

Legal status

Canada
As of October 31, 2016; 2C-H is a controlled substance (Schedule III) in Canada.

United States 
As of July 9, 2012, 2C-H is a Schedule I controlled substance in the United States, under the Synthetic Drug Abuse Prevention Act of 2012. 2C-H's DEA Drug Code is 7517.

See also 

 Phenethylamine
 2C (psychedelics)
 PiHKAL
 Psychedelics, dissociatives and deliriants

References

External links 
 NIST WebBook Entry
 DEA's Microgram

2C (psychedelics)